Qalandar (also Romanized as Ghalandar) is a village in Khaveh-ye Jonubi Rural District, in the Central District of Delfan County, Lorestan Province, Iran. At the 2006 census, its population was 638, in 147 families.

References 

Towns and villages in Delfan County